is an electoral district in the Japanese House of Representatives. The district was established in 1994 at the introudction of the single member constitutency system, and it is currently represented by the Liberal Democratic Party's Masanobu Ogura.

Areas Covered

Current District 
As of 12 January 2023, the bareas that are covered by this district are as follows:

 Machida

As part of the 2022 reapportionments, the remaining sections of Tama were given to the new 30th district. As a result of this the 23rd district became the only district in Western Tokyo to be composed of a single municipality.

Areas from 2017 to 2022 
Between the first redistricting in 2017 and the second redistricting in 2022, the areas covered by this district were as follows:

 Machida
 Parts of Tama 
 Sekido 5 (excluding 1-8 & 13-31), Sekido 6, Kaitori, Gouda, Wada, Mogusa, Ochikawa, Higashiterakata, Sakuragaoka 1-4, Hijirigaoka 1 (1-24, 35, Excluding 44), Umabikizawa 1-2, Sannoshita, Nakazawa, Karakida, Suwa 1-6, Nagayama 1-7, Kaitori 1-5, Toyogaoka 1-6, Ochiai 1-6 Chome , Tsurumaki 1-6 , Minamino 1-3, Higashi Terakata 3, Wada 3, Atago 1-4

As part of the 2017 redistricting, part of Tama was transferred to the 21st district.

Areas from before 2017 
From the districts creation in 1994 and its first redistricting in 2017, the areas covered by this district were as follows:

 Machida
 Tama

Elected Representatives

Election Results 
‡ - Also ran in the Tokyo PR district

‡‡ - Also ran in the Tokyo PR district and won.

References

Related 

Constituencies established in 1994
Districts of Tokyo